Grand Internal Princess Consort Hadong (Hangul: 하동부대부인 정씨, Hanja: 河東府大夫人 鄭氏; 23 September 1522 – 24 June 1567), of the Hadong Jeong clan, was a Korean Joseon dynasty royal family member though her marriage with Grand Internal Prince Deokheung, the son of Jungjong of Joseon and Royal Consort Chang of Ansan Ahn clan, and the biological mother of Seonjo of Joseon. However, she died not long before her third son ascended the throne.

She was also known as Princess Consort Hadong (Hangul: 하동부부인, Hanja: 河東府夫人), Princess Consort Hadong (Hangul: 하동군부인, Hanja: 河東郡夫人) or Lady Hadong (Hangul: 하동부인, Hanja: 河東夫人) before becoming Budaebuin.

Biography

Early life
The future Grand Internal Princess Consort Hadong was born into the Hadong Jeong clan on 23 September 1522 as the daughter of Jeong Se-Ho, and his wife, Lady Yi of the Gwangju Yi clan.

Her father, Jeong Se-Ho was the son of Jeong Sang-Jo and Lady Ahn of the Juksan Ahn clan; making him the grandson and Lady Jeong a great-granddaughter of Jeong In-ji. Her paternal grandmother, Lady Ahn, was the granddaughter of Princess Jeongui; who was the second daughter of Queen Soheon and King Sejong. Thus making her the maternal great-great-granddaughter through her grandmother.

Meanwhile, her mother was the daughter of Yi Se-geol and Lady Jeon of the Jeongseon Jeon clan. Lady Jeong had 2 older brothers and a younger brother. Her paternal cousin, Lady Jeong of the Hadong Jeong clan, eventually became the grandmother of Queen Yu, the wife of King Gwanghaegun.

Marriage and later life
She later married Yi Cho when he was still Prince Deokheung (덕흥군, 德興君) and was honoured as Princess Consort Hadong (하동군부인, 河東郡夫人). Her father was then honored as Duke Hyogan, Internal Prince Hadong (효간공 하동부원군).

During her marriage, she gave birth to a son in 1545, a second son in 1546, a daughter in 1548, and a third son in 1552.

On 24 June 1567, during King Myeongjong’s 22nd year of reign, she died at 46 years old. Her tomb is located near from her husband's tomb.

Seonjo's ascension to the throne
Two months after her death, her third son, Yi Yeon, Prince Haseong succeeded Myeongjong who died without a royal heir. Thus becoming Myeongjong's adopted son when the prince ascended the throne as the 14th king of Joseon. Her husband couldn’t be King (왕, 王) because of his low background, so the throne was immediately passed down to his legitimate son. On 1 November 1569, as the Princess Consort was the biological parent of the reigning King, she was granted the royal title of Princess Consort Hadong (하동부부인, 河東府夫人) at first, but was later changed to Grand Internal Princess Consort Hadong (하동부대부인, 河東府大夫人).

Family
Father - Jeong Se-Ho, Duke Hyogan, Internal Prince Hadong (1486 - 1563) (정세호 효간공 하동부원군)
Grandfather - Jeong Sang-Jo (1459 - 1491) (정상조, 鄭尙祖)
Grandmother - Lady Ahn of the Juksan Ahn clan (1459 - 1521) (정경부인 죽산 안씨)
Mother - Lady Yi of the Gwangju Yi clan (정경부인 광주 이씨)
Grandfather - Yi Se-Geol (1463 - 1504) (이세걸, 李世傑)  
Grandmother - Lady Jeon of the Jeongseon Jeon clan (정선 전씨)
Sibling(s):
 Older brother - Jeong Chang-Seo (1519 - ?) (정창서, 鄭昌瑞)
Sister-in-law - Lady Yi of the Jeonju Yi clan (전주 이씨)
Sister-in-law - Lady Kim of the Gwangsan Kim clan (광산 김씨)
 Niece - Lady Jeong of the Hadong Jeong clan (하동 정씨, 河東 鄭氏)
 Nephew-in-law - Jeong Dae-gil (정대길, 鄭大吉)
 Older brother - Jeong Chang-Su (정창수, 鄭昌壽)
Younger brother - Jeong Hong-Su (정홍수, 鄭弘壽)

Husband - Grand Internal Prince Deokheung (2 April 1530 - 14 June 1559) (덕흥대원군)
Father-in-law - Jungjong of Joseon (16 April 1488 - 29 November 1544) (조선 중종 왕)
Mother-in-law: 
Biological - Royal Noble Consort Chang of the Ansan Ahn clan (2 September 1499 - 7 November 1549) (창빈 안씨)
Legal - Queen Janggyeong of the Papyeong Yun clan (10 August 1491 - 16 March 1515) (장경왕후 윤씨)
Legal - Queen Munjeong of the Papyeong Yun clan (2 December 1501 - 5 May 1565) (문정왕후 윤씨)
Issue(s):
Son - Yi Jeong, Prince Hawon (1545 - 1597) (이정 하원군)
Daughter-in-law - Princess Consort Namyang of the Namyang Hong clan (1544 - 1569) (남양군부인 남양 홍씨)
Grandson - Yi In-ryeong, Prince Dangeun (당은군 이인령, 唐恩君 李引齡) (1562 - 1615)
Granddaughter - Yi Hui-ryeong (이희령, 李稀齡) (1563 - ?)
Grandson - Yi Hyang-ryeong, Prince Ikseong (익성군 이향령, 益城君 李享齡) (24 March 1566 - 1 July 1614)
Grandson - Yi Seok-ryeong, Prince Yeongje (영제군 이석령, 寧堤君 錫齡) (1568 - 1623)
Daughter-in-law - Princess Consort Sinan of the Seongju Yi clan (1556 - 1616) (신안군부인 성주 이씨) — No issue.
Son - Yi In, Duke Hyojeong, Prince Hareung (1546 - 1592) (이인 효정공 하릉군)
Daughter-in-law - Princess Consort Pyeongsan of the Pyeongsan Shin clan (평산군부인 평산 신씨)
Daughter - Yi Myeong-Sun (1548 - ?) (이명순)
Son-in-law - Ahn Hwang, Prince Gwangyang (1549 - 1593) (안황 광양군)
Son: Yi Yeon, Prince Haseong (26 November 1552 - 16 March 1608) (이연 하성군)
Daughter-in-law - Queen Uiin of the Bannam Park clan (5 May 1555 - 5 August 1600) (의인왕후 박씨) – No issue.
Daughter-in-law - Queen Inmok of the Yeonan Kim clan (15 December 1584 - 13 August 1632) (인목왕후 김씨)
Granddaughter - Princess Jeongmyeong (27 June 1603 - 8 September 1685) (정명공주)
Grandson-in-law - Hong Ju-Won, Prince Consort Yeongan (1606 - 1672) (홍주원 영안위)
 Unnamed granddaughter (1604); died prematurely
Grandson - Yi Ui, Grand Prince Yeongchang (12 April 1606 - 19 March 1614) (이의 영창대군)

References

1522 births
1567 deaths
16th-century Korean people
16th-century Korean women